Chauncey Milton Abbott (1822 – November 11, 1863) was an American politician from New York.

Life
He was born in that part of the Town of Sempronius which was separated in 1833 as the Town of Niles, in Cayuga County, New York.

In 1845, he married Adaline Oakley (1823–1907), and they had several children.

He was a member of the New York State Assembly (Cayuga Co., 2nd D.) in 1858 and 1859.

He was a member of the New York State Senate (25th D.) in 1862 and 1863.

He died at his residence in Niles, and was buried at the Twelve Corners Cemetery there.

Sources
 The New York Civil List compiled by Franklin Benjamin Hough, Stephen C. Hutchins and Edgar Albert Werner (1870; pg. 443, 486 and 488)
 Biographical Sketches of the State Officers and the Members of the Legislature of the State of New York in 1862 and '63 by William D. Murphy (1863; pg. 40ff)
 The American Annual Cyclopedia and Register of Important Events of the Year 1863 (1868; pg. 721)

External links

1822 births
1863 deaths
Republican Party New York (state) state senators
People from Sempronius, New York
Republican Party members of the New York State Assembly
19th-century American politicians